Kambili: The Whole 30 Yards—also simply known as Kambili—is a 2020 Nigerian romantic comedy film written by Ozioma Ogbaji, and directed by Kayode Kasum. It stars Nancy Isime and Jide Kene Achufusi in lead roles, and follows a young woman on her self-discovery journey after her quest to marry before she turns 30 fails. The theatrical release was on 4 December 2020, and opened to mixed reviews from critics.

Plot
Kambili Maduka (Nancy Isime), a disorganised, compulsive shopaholic, is suspended from her office job due to repeated lateness. Her troubles worsen when John (Mawuli Gavor), her boyfriend of two years, unceremoniously breaks up with her before her 29th birthday, stating she is unsuitable wife material. The news disheartens her as she had hoped to marry before she turned 30. On a night out with her friends to celebrate her birthday, a downcast Kambili announces her plans to win John back by proving her maturity, but discovers the landlord has ejected her due to late rent payment when she returns to her apartment.

After spending the night at her mother Cynthia's (Elvina Ibru) who is now engaged to toyboy Bankole (Uzor Arukwe), Kambili stubbornly leaves for best friend Chidi's (Jideofor Kene Achufusi) apartment, to his girlfriend Linda's (Sharon Ooja) chagrin. Upon reflection, and firmly determined, Kambili follows her passion and opens an art gallery, with her supportive friends Chidi, Biodun (Venita Akpofure), and Jesse (Koye Kekere-Ekun) collaborating to transform her goal into success. It is during this period she reluctantly moves back in with Cynthia after Linda demands she leaves Chidi's house, and gradually warms to Bankole, who has offered valuable business advice.

John attends the gallery's launch and is impressed with Kambili's progress since their breakup. He asks her out for a drink, and despite having made plans with her friends who had supported her through the past months she accepts his offer, and the couple rekindle their relationship. After Kambili drops several hints, John reluctantly proposes, but her friends refuse to share in her joy, accusing her of regularly taking them for granted, and she falls out with them. Meanwhile, Linda realises Kambili will always remain top priority in Chidi's life, and after another argument the couple split. Kambili also breaks up with John upon realising she will never meet his high standards.

Kambili returns to work where she impresses her boss Jessica (Toyin Abraham) with her time-keeping skills. However, Kambili is subsequently made redundant since her gallery takes up most of her time, but not before Jessica commends her newly-discovered maturity and development, and Kambili decides to focus solely on her business. She also realises she will never meet John's impossibly high standards, and after breaking off her engagement she reconciles with her friends, including Chidi with whom she finally begins a relationship.

Cast 
 Nancy Isime as Kambili
 Jide Kene Achufusi as Chidi
 Mawuli Gavor as John
 Elvina Ibru as Cynthia
 Sharon Ooja as Linda
 Venita Akpofure as Biodun
 Koye Kekere-Ekun as Jesse
 Uzor Arukwe as Bankole
 Toyin Abraham as Jessica
 Oge Amuta as Funmi

Production 
The film was jointly produced by distribution company FilmOne Entertainment in association with South Africa's Empire Entertainment and China's Huahua Media. The collaboration deal was successfully reached in December 2018. It also marked FilmOne's maiden collaboration with South African and Chinese production companies. However the film project was in development hell over a year and it was supposed to be the first production venture for FilmOne Entertainment with director Kayode Kasum.

The entire cast and crew members who were hired to play their respective roles in the film were all reportedly below the age of 35. The colour green was depicted as the central theme throughout the filming.

Release 
The film was initially slated for theatrical release on 12 June 2020 but it was later pushed back to September 2020 due to the COVID-19 pandemic in Nigeria. The film producers officially announced the new release date as 16 October 2020 but it was postponed again due to the End SARS protests. It was finally released on 4 December 2020.

Reception 
A reviewer for Afrocritik scored the movie 5.9/10 saying "The major problem with Kambili is that half the time, it seems to forget it is a rom-com...Not only is the movie longer than it needs to be, but the time and effort dedicated to brewing the romance between Kambili and her eventual love interest are also grossly inadequate."

Awards and nominations

References

External links 

 

2020 romantic comedy films
English-language Nigerian films
Nigerian romantic comedy films
Films directed by Kayode Kasum
2020s English-language films